"The Whole World" is the first single released from American hip hop duo Outkast's first compilation album, Big Boi and Dre Present... Outkast (2001). The song was written by Outkast, produced by Earthtone III, and features Killer Mike and Joi. Upon its release as a single in November 2001, "The Whole World" peaked at number 19 on both the US Billboard Hot 100 and the UK Singles Chart. The song won the 2003 Grammy Award for Best Rap Performance by a Duo or Group.

Track listings

US 12-inch single
 "The Whole World" (radio edit) – 4:21
 "The Whole World" (instrumental) – 4:54
 "The Whole World" (club mix) – 4:57
 "The Whole World" (a cappella) – 4:23

UK CD single
 "The Whole World" (featuring Killer Mike) – 4:21
 "Rosa Parks" – 5:24
 "B.O.B" – 4:18
 "The Whole World" (video)

UK cassette single and European CD single
 "The Whole World" (featuring Killer Mike) – 4:21
 "Rosa Parks" – 5:24

UK 12-inch single
A1. "The Whole World" (featuring Killer Mike) – 4:21
A2. "Rosa Parks" – 5:24
B1. "The Whole World" (instrumental) – 4:21

Australian and New Zealand CD single
 "The Whole World" (featuring Killer Mike) – 4:21
 "Rosa Parks" – 5:24
 "B.O.B" – 5:04
 "The Whole World" (instrumental) – 4:54

Charts

Weekly charts

Year-end charts

Release history

References

2001 singles
2001 songs
Arista Records singles
LaFace Records singles
Music videos directed by Bryan Barber
Outkast songs